The Shwezigon Pagoda Bell is a temple bell located at the Shwezigon Pagoda in Bagan, Myanmar. The 3423 kg bell was dedicated to the pagoda by King Bayinnaung of Toungoo Dynasty in 1557. The inscriptions on the bell in Burmese, Mon, and Pali describe the important events of the first six years of his reign.

References

Bibliography
 

Individual bells in Myanmar
First Toungoo Empire